Nataraja Service is a 2016 Indian Kannada language romantic emotional comedy film directed by Pavan Wadeyar, produced by N.S. Rajkumar and presented by Puneeth Rajkumar. It stars Sharan and Mayuri Kyatari. The music was composed by Anoop Seelin whilst the cinematography was by Arul K. Somasundaram.

P Ravi Shankar makes a special appearance in the song "Allah Allah Nataraja Bartonella" which was rendered by music director Anoop Seeli.

Cast
 Sharan as Nataraja
 Mayuri Kyatari as Sahana
 Rockline Venkatesh
 Apoorva
 Yathiraj
 Nagaraj Murthy
 P. Ravi Shankar in a special appearance

Production 
Principal photography for the film began in October 2015. The shooting was held at Bangalore, Mysore, Shimoga, Davanagere, Mandya, Dandeli and Sirsi locations and was completed in early June 2016. After several announcements, the film was finally released on 17 November 2016.

Soundtrack

Anoop Seelin composed the film's background score and soundtrack. An opening song of the film is sung by Puneeth Rajkumar and penned by Pavan Wadeyar. According to Wadeyar, the song speaks about the "benefits of walking" and has a philosophical message as the theme. The audio was released on 28 July 2016.

References

External links
 Facebook page

2016 films
2016 romantic comedy films
Films scored by Anoop Seelin
Indian romantic comedy films
2010s Kannada-language films
Films directed by Pavan Wadeyar